Lev Grigoryevich Gorelik (born 28 January 1992) is a Russian footballer who plays as a goalkeeper for Hapoel Iksal.

Club career
He made his debut in the Russian Second Division for FC Karelia Petrozavodsk on 17 August 2012 in a game against FC Lokomotiv-2 Moscow.

References

External links
 Career summary by sportbox.ru
 

1992 births
Living people
Russian Jews
Russian footballers
Jewish Russian sportspeople
Association football goalkeepers
FC TSK Simferopol players
Maccabi Herzliya F.C. players
Maccabi Ironi Kiryat Ata F.C. players
Maccabi Ironi Tamra F.C. players
Hapoel Iksal F.C. players
Liga Leumit players
Russian emigrants to Israel
Crimean Premier League players